The Sanglakh Range is an offshoot of the Hindu Kush, just west of Kabul in Maidan Wardak Province. Its main peak is the Unai; Both the Helmand River and the Kabul River rise in the Sanglakh Range, separated by the Unai Pass.

Mountain ranges of Afghanistan